Wayne Thomas (born 28 August 1978) is an English former professional footballer who played in the Football League for Mansfield Town, Shrewsbury Town and Walsall.

References

1978 births
Living people
English footballers
Association football midfielders
English Football League players
Mansfield Town F.C. players
Walsall F.C. players
Kidderminster Harriers F.C. players
Shrewsbury Town F.C. players
Hednesford Town F.C. players